Salto Department is a department of the northwestern region of Uruguay. Its capital is the city of Salto. It borders Artigas Department to its north, Paysandú Department to its south, the departments of Rivera and Tacuarembó to its east and has the Río Uruguay flowing at its west, separating it from Argentina.

History

The first division of the Republic in six departments happened on 27 January 1816. Two more departments were formed later in that year. At the time, Paysandú Department included all the territory north of the Río Negro, which included the actual departments of Artigas, Rivera, Tacuarembó, Salto, Paysandú and Río Negro. On 17 June 1837 a new division of Uruguay was made and the department of Salto was created including the actual Artigas Department. Its final borders were defined on 1 October 1884, when the Artigas Department was separated from Salto by the Act of Ley Nº 1854.

Demographics

At the 2011 census, Salto Department had a population of 124,878 (61,071 male and 63,807 female) and 42,486 households.

Demographic data for Salto Department in 2010:
Population growth rate: 0.552%
Birth Rate: 17.32 births/1,000 people
Death Rate: 8.26 deaths/1,000 people
Average age: 29.0 (27.6 male, 30.3 female)
Life Expectancy at Birth:
Total population: 75.03 years
Male: 72.07 years
Female: 78.20 years
Average per household income: 23,390 pesos/month
Urban per capita income: 8,409 pesos/month
2010 Data Source:

Map of the department

Government
The executive power is exercised by the Intendencia Municipal de Salto. The Intendant is elected every five years with the possibility of reelection.

The following Municipalities have been formed in Salto Department:
 Constitución
 Belén
 Rincón de Valentín
 Colonia Lavalleja
 San Antonio
 Mataojo

Tourism
There are Mineral spas at Termas del Daymán and Termas del Arapey. The displays in Museo del Hombre y la Tecnología demonstrate man's interaction with technology.

Notable people
 Rafael Addiego Bruno, President of Uruguay in 1985 as an interim measure, born in Salto.
 Edinson Cavani, Football player, playing for Manchester United in England, born in Salto.
 Irineo Leguisamo, one of the foremost South American jockeys of the 20th century 
 Luis Suárez, Football player, playing for Atlético Madrid in Spain, born in Salto

See also
 List of populated places in Uruguay#Salto Department
  Detailed map of Salto Department (800x525px)showing most populated places and secondary roads.See full size version in Commons.

References

External links

INE map of Salto Department
Nuestra Terra, Colección Los Departamentos, Vol.8 "Salto"

 
Departments of Uruguay
States and territories established in 1837
1837 establishments in Uruguay